The 2016 President's Cup was the third President's Cup contested for. The match was played between 2015 League of Ireland Premier Division champions Dundalk and 2015 FAI Cup runners-up Cork City on 27 February 2016, at Turners Cross.
Cork City won the match 2-0, taking the lead in the 20th minute through Gavan Holohan and doubled the advantage in the second half through Sean Maguire’s header.

Match

See also
 2015 FAI Cup
 2015 League of Ireland Premier Division

References

2016
2016 in Republic of Ireland association football cups
Dundalk F.C. matches
Cork City F.C. matches
February 2016 sports events in Europe